Henri Guisol (12 October 1904 – 11 May 1994) was a French film actor. He appeared in more than seventy films from 1931 to 1980. He enjoyed a career in French who done its and film noir.

Filmography

References

External links
 

1904 births
1994 deaths
People from Aix-en-Provence
French male film actors
20th-century French male actors